U.S. Term Limits is a non-profit, non-partisan grassroots organization dedicated to enacting term limits for elected officials at every level of government in the United States. It was founded in 1992, and claims to have helped facilitate more than 500 successful term limits initiatives at various levels of government.

Among other activities, USTL supports statewide ballot initiatives to impose term limits. In the early 1990s, USTL organized grassroots campaigns that placed term limits on the congressional delegations of 23 states. These were overturned as unconstitutional in 1995 by the Supreme Court, in a 5–4 decision in U.S. Term Limits v. Thornton.

U.S. Term Limits is promoting a convention to propose amendments under Article V of the U.S. Constitution, focused specifically on a term limits amendment. Resolutions calling for such a convention have been passed by the state legislatures of Florida, Alabama, Missouri, West Virginia, and Wisconsin.

References

External links
U.S. Term Limits homepage

Political organizations based in the United States
Organizations established in 1992
Term limits